Marc López Tarrés (born 31 July 1982) is a Spanish retired professional tennis player and coach. His career-high ATP singles ranking was world No. 106 (May 2004) and world No. 3 in doubles (January 2013).

Partnering Feliciano López, Marc López won a major title at the 2016 French Open as well as the 2012 ATP Finals. Additionally, at the 2016 Rio Olympics, López won the gold medal in men's doubles for Spain partnering Rafael Nadal.

Professional career

2001
In his ATP debut at Stuttgart as a qualifier ranked 236, López defeated Richard Fromberg, eventual French Open finalist Guillermo Coria, two-time French Open winner Sergi Bruguera, and Alberto Martín en route to the semifinals, where he lost to Guillermo Cañas.

2004
Although in his beginnings López did not achieve very good results playing doubles, in the last years he has won several doubles titles in Challengers and his best performance in an ATP tournament was in this modality. That was in 2004, when he reached the final of the Open de Tenis Comunidad Valenciana partnering with his friend and countryman Feliciano López.

2008
In April 2008 in Barcelona, López beat No. 141 Yuri Schukin to qualify into the ATP main draw, where he beat No. 68 Ivo Minář before losing to No. 37 Juan Ignacio Chela.
In May, he made the main draw of the 2008 French Open as a lucky loser after beating No. 124 Andreas Beck.

2010-2013
In 2010, López won three doubles titles, including the Masters 1000 at Indian Wells partnering Rafael Nadal. They defeated Daniel Nestor and Serbian Nenad Zimonjić in the final. López made the year-end finals with his frequent partner Marcel Granollers. They won the tournament, defeating the Indian duo of Mahesh Bhupathi and Rohan Bopanna in the final.

In 2012, Marc and Rafael Nadal, again won the doubles final at Indian Wells, defeating Americans John Isner and Sam Querrey. He and Granollers also won the Masters 1000 in Rome, beating Łukasz Kubot
and Janko Tipsarević in the final. In Toronto, they were defeated in the final by the Bryan brothers.

In 2013, they only made one final, in Cincinnati, where they again fell to the Bryan brothers.

2014–2017
In 2014, López and Granollers made two Grand Slam finals. At the French Open they were defeated by French duo Édouard Roger-Vasselin and Julien Benneteau. At the US Open, they lost the final to the Bryan brothers.

In 2015, they again made the Masters 1000 final in Rome, but were defeated by Pablo Cuevas and fellow Spaniard David Marrero.

In 2016, López teamed with countryman Feliciano López to win the tournament in Doha, Qatar, and they also made a runner-up showing in Dubai.  López won his first major at the 2016 French Open with Feliciano López.

In 2016 Rio Olympics he teamed up with Rafael Nadal to win the gold medal in the men's doubles event.

On 6 September 2016 at the 2016 US Open, López was part of the last match ever played at the old Louis Armstrong Stadium. Alongside his partner Feliciano López, they defeated the Bryan brothers (Bob and Mike) in the quarterfinals of the men's doubles tournament, the score 7–6(7–2), 4–6, 6–3. The pair then lost in the semifinals against fellow countrymen Pablo Carreño Busta and Guillermo García López in straight sets.

In 2017, they made another Masters 1000 final in Monte Carlo, but were defeated by Pablo Cuevas and Rohan Bopanna.

At the 2017 US Open, Marc and Feliciano went one step further then the previous year by defeating again the Bryan Brothers en route to the final where they lost to Jean-Julien Rojer and Horia Tecău.

2021-2022: Coaching and Retirement 
In December 2021, López joined Nadal's coaching team.

Lopez announced he would retire after the Barcelona Open. There, he partnered Feliciano Lopez where they defeated the top ranked pair of world No. 1 Joe Salisbury and world No. 2 Rajeev Ram in the first round. However, he then received a wildcard for the Madrid Masters to partner Carlos Alcaraz in doubles. The pair lost in the round of 16 to Wesley Koolhof and Neal Skupski for what was Lopez's final match in his career.

Significant finals

Grand Slam finals

Doubles: 4 (1 title, 3 runners-up)

Year-end championships

Doubles: 1 (1 title)

Masters 1000 finals

Doubles: 7 (3 titles, 4 runners-up)

Olympic medal matches

Doubles: 1 (1 gold medal)

ATP career finals

Doubles: 34 (14 titles, 19 runner-ups)

Performance timelines

Singles

Doubles
Current through the 2022 Mutua Madrid Open.

Personal life

He married his girlfriend María S. in November 2015, after a four-year relationship. The couple separated in 2017.

In August 2021, López welcomed his first child with María García-Planas Albert, a former college tennis player at the Loyola Marymount University.

References

External links
 
 
 
 Lopez Recent Match Results
 Lopez World Ranking History

1982 births
Living people
Tennis players from Catalonia
French Open junior champions
French Open champions
Grand Slam (tennis) champions in men's doubles
Spanish male tennis players
Tennis players from Barcelona
Tennis players at the 2016 Summer Olympics
Olympic tennis players of Spain
Olympic gold medalists for Spain
Olympic medalists in tennis
Medalists at the 2016 Summer Olympics
Grand Slam (tennis) champions in boys' doubles